The 2014 CPISRA Football 7-a-side European Championships was the European championship for men's national 7-a-side association football teams. CPISRA stands for Cerebral Palsy International Sports & Recreation Association. Athletes with a physical disability competed. The Championship took place in Portugal from 23 July to 2 August 2014.

Football 7-a-side was played with modified FIFA rules. Among the modifications were that there were seven players, no offside, a smaller playing field, and permission for one-handed throw-ins. Matches consisted of two thirty-minute halves, with a fifteen-minute half-time break. The Championships was a qualifying event for the 2015 IFCPF CP Football World Championships.

Participating teams and officials

Teams

The draw
During the draw, the teams were divided into pots because of rankings. Here, the following groups:

Squads

Group A

Group B

Group C

Venues
The venues to be used for the European Championships were located in Maia.

Format

The first round, or group stage, was a competition between the 11 teams divided among two groups of four and one group of three, where each group engaged in a round-robin tournament within itself. The two highest ranked teams in each group and the best two third-placed of the groups advanced to the knockout stage for the position one to eight. The other teams played for the positions nine to eleven. The Teams were awarded three points for a win and one for a draw. When comparing teams in a group over-all result came before head-to-head.

In the knockout stage there were three rounds (quarter-finals, semi-finals, and the final). The winners plays for the higher positions, the losers for the lower positions. For any match in the knockout stage, a draw after 60 minutes of regulation time was followed by two 10 minute periods of extra time to determine a winner. If the teams were still tied, a penalty shoot-out was held to determine a winner.

Classification
Athletes with a physical disability competed. The athlete's disability was caused by a non-progressive brain damage that affects motor control, such as cerebral palsy, traumatic brain injury or stroke. Athletes must be ambulant.

Players were classified by level of disability.
C5: Athletes with difficulties when walking and running, but not in standing or when kicking the ball.
C6: Athletes with control and co-ordination problems of their upper limbs, especially when running.
C7: Athletes with hemiplegia.
C8: Athletes with minimal disability; must meet eligibility criteria and have an impairment that has impact on the sport of football.

Teams must field at least one class C5 or C6 player at all times. No more than two players of class C8 are permitted to play at the same time.

Group stage
The first round, or group stage, have seen the sixteen teams divided into four groups of four teams.

Group A

Group B

Group C

able of third-placed teams from each group
To compare the third-placed teams, only the games counted against the first-placed and second placed team, because in group C were only three teams. In this table, the two best teams rose to the quarter-finals, the third-placed nation must play the games at the 9th to 11th place.

Thus was laid on 25 July that the teams from Northern Ireland and Portugal were promoted to the quarter-finals, the team from Finland had to play for the 9th to 11th place.

Knockout stage

Quarter-finals

Semi-finals
Position 5-8

Position 1-4

Finals
Position 9-11

Position 7-8

Position 5-6

1 = Match was not played due to bad weather conditions

Position 3-4

Final

Statistics

Goalscorers
8 goals
  Iljas Visker

7 goals
  Peter Kooij

5 goals

  Tomiwa Badun
  Michael Barker
  Eduard Ramonov
  Dillon Sheridan

4 goals

  Lars Conijn
  Luke Evans
  Barry Halloran
  Aleksandr Kuligin
  Gary Messett
  Jack Rutter
  Anton Saedt

3 goals

  Alexey Chesmin
  Oleksandr Devlysh
  Conny Fritsch
  Martin Hickman
  Mitch Lebon
  Stephan Lokhoff
  Laurie McGinley
  Emil Møller
  Lasha Murvanadze
  Jonathan Paterson
  Vitalii Romanchuk
  Victor Sørensen
  Aaron Tier
  Vítor Vilarinho
  Ryan Walker
  Kevin Wermeester

2 goals

  Volodymyr Antonyuk
  Darragh Byrne
  David Levy
  George Fletcher
  Philipp Freudinger
  Peter Hansen
  Podge Leacy
  Dmytro Molodtsov
  Eric O'Flaherty
  Tiago Ramos
  Hendrik Rodenburg

1 goal

  James Blackwell
  Stefan Boersma
  Jake Brown
  Thomas Brown
  Christian Canning
  Tiago Carneiro
  Peter Cotter
  Daan Dikken
  Myron Gebbink
  Blair Glynn
  Frederic Heinze
  Janne Helander
  Dmytro Hetman
  Mikael Jukarainen
  Viacheslav Larionov
  Joseph Markey
  Joey Mense
  Jamie Mitchell
  Ryan Nolan
  Oliver Nugent
  Dmitrii Pestritsov
  Denys Ponomarov
  Mark Robertson
  Rui Rocha
  Andreas Simonsen
  Glenn Sambleben
  Vitaliy Trushev
  Jordan Walker
  Yevhen Zinoviev

own goals

  David Levy
  Ryan Walker

Ranking

See also

References

External links
Official website
Official website from 25 October 2014
Cerebral Palsy International Sports & Recreation Association (CPISRA)
International Federation of Cerebral Palsy Football (IFCPF)

2014 in association football
2014
2014–15 in Portuguese football
Paralympic association football